Hilda Gaxiola Álvarez (born July 14, 1972 in Guamúchil, Sinaloa) is a female beach volleyball player from Mexico, who won the silver medal in the women's beach team competition at the 2003 Pan American Games in Santo Domingo, Dominican Republic, partnering Mayra García. She represented her native country at two consecutive Summer Olympics, starting in 2000 in Sydney, Australia.

References
  

1972 births
Living people
Mexican beach volleyball players
Women's beach volleyball players
Beach volleyball players at the 2000 Summer Olympics
Beach volleyball players at the 2004 Summer Olympics
Olympic beach volleyball players of Mexico
Beach volleyball players at the 2003 Pan American Games
Sportspeople from Sinaloa
Mexican people of Basque descent
Pan American Games silver medalists for Mexico
Pan American Games medalists in volleyball
Central American and Caribbean Games gold medalists for Mexico
Competitors at the 2002 Central American and Caribbean Games
People from Guamúchil
Central American and Caribbean Games medalists in beach volleyball
Medalists at the 2003 Pan American Games